Adult Alternative Airplay (also known as Triple A or Triple A Airplay, and formerly Adult Alternative Songs and Triple A Songs) is a record chart currently published by Billboard that ranks the most popular songs on adult album alternative radio stations. The 40-position chart is formulated based on each song's weekly radio spins, as measured by Nielsen Broadcast Data Systems. The earliest incarnation of the chart was first published on January 20, 1996, as a feature in Billboard sister publication Airplay Monitor. In 2006, Airplay Monitor ceased publication after Billboard parent company VNU Media's acquisition of rival radio trade magazine Radio & Records, which then subsequently incorporated Airplay Monitors Nielsen-based Triple A chart.

Billboard itself began publishing the Triple A chart in the issue dated July 5, 2008 through their Billboard.biz website, appropriating the same airplay data as Radio & Records. Radio & Records closed in June 2009, leaving Billboard as the sole publisher of the chart. In February 2014, the chart's reporting panel was expanded from 23 to 32 stations, including non-commercial reporters for the first time. 

Following a re-design of their website, Billboard officially incorporated the history of the Airplay Monitor/Nielsen chart from 1996 to 2008 into their Adult Alternative Songs chart. The Billboard website and its official chart archive now shows the first Adult Alternative Songs chart as having been published on January 20, 1996, with "The World I Know" by Collective Soul as its first number one single. Radio And Records first charted their Adult Alternative chart in the September 22, 1995 issue. It was a 30 position chart, and "Til I Hear It from You" by the Gin Blossoms was the first number one. The current number one song is "Tropic Morning News" by The National.

Chart achievements
Artists with the most number-one songs:
U2 (13)
Coldplay (13)
Dave Matthews Band (11)
Jack Johnson (11)
John Mayer (8)
Death Cab for Cutie (8)
Sheryl Crow (7)
Counting Crows (7)
R.E.M. (7)
The Black Keys (7)
Florence + the Machine (6)
The Lumineers (6)

 Artists with most top 10 songs:
U2 (26)
Dave Matthews Band (24)
Coldplay (23)
Jack Johnson (19)
John Mayer (19)
Counting Crows (15)
Sheryl Crow (14)
R.E.M. (13)

Most weeks at number one:
16 weeks
"Beautiful Day" – U2 (2000–01)

15 weeks
"Clocks" – Coldplay (2003)
"Waste a Moment" – Kings of Leon (2016–17)

14 weeks
"One Headlight" – The Wallflowers (1996)
"3AM" – Matchbox Twenty (1997)
"Bent" – Matchbox Twenty (2000)
"Drops of Jupiter (Tell Me)" – Train (2001)
"Rolling in the Deep" – Adele (2011)

13 weeks
"Smooth - Santana featuring Rob Thomas (1999)
"Just Breathe" – Pearl Jam (2010)
"Somebody That I Used to Know" – Gotye featuring Kimbra (2012)
"Upside Down" - Jack Johnson (2006)

12 weeks
"Funny the Way It Is" – Dave Matthews Band (2009)
"Dreams" – Beck (2015)

11 weeks
"Hold On" - KT Tunstall (2007)
"Viva la Vida" – Coldplay (2008)
"You and Your Heart" – Jack Johnson (2010)
"I Will Wait" – Mumford & Sons (2012)
"Ophelia" – The Lumineers (2016)
"Feel It Still" – Portugal. The Man (2017)

10 weeks
"Building a Mystery" - Sarah McLachlan (1997)
"Soul Meets Body" - Death Cab For Cutie (2005)
"Good People" - Jack Johnson (2006)
"If I Had Eyes" – Jack Johnson (2008)
"Fugitive" – David Gray (2010)
"Fever" – The Black Keys (2014)
"Budapest" – George Ezra (2014–15)
"Guiding Light" – Mumford & Sons (2018–19)

See also
 List of Radio & Records number-one adult alternative singles of the 1990s
 List of Billboard number-one adult alternative singles of the 2000s
 List of Billboard number-one adult alternative singles of the 2010s
 List of Billboard number-one adult alternative singles of the 2020s

References

External links
 Adult Alternative Songs at Billboard

Billboard charts